Thirunal is a surname. Notable people with the surname include:

Bharani Thirunal Lakshmi Bayi CI (1848–1901), the Senior Rani of Travancore from 1857 until her death in 1901
Ayilyam Thirunal (1832–1880), the ruler of the princely state of Travancore in India from 1860 to 1880
Moolam Thirunal, the ruling Maharajah of the Indian state of Travancore between 1885 and 1924
Uthradom Thirunal (1814–1860), the Maharajah of Travancore state in southern India
Uthram Thirunal (1814–1860), the Maharajah of Travancore state in southern India
Visakham Thirunal (1837–1885), the Maharaja of Travancore from 1880 to 1885
Anizham Thirunal Marthanda Varma (1706–1758), king of Travancore from 1729 until his death in 1758
Aswathi Thirunal Rama Varma, South Indian classical musician, a performing vocalist, veena player and writer
Chithira Thirunal Balarama Varma (1912–1991), the last ruling maharaja of Travancore, in southern India
Swathi Thirunal Rama Varma (1813–1846), the Maharaja of Travancore in India
Uthradom Thirunal Marthanda Varma (born 1922), the current titular Maharaja of Travancore

See also
Sree Chitra Thirunal College of Engineering, state-government engineering college in Thiruvananthapuram, Kerala, India
Swathi Thirunal College of Music, music college in Thiruvananthapuram, Kerala, India
Sree Chitra Thirunal Institute of Medical Sciences and Technology (SCTIMST), Thiruvananthapuram (Trivandrum), India established in 1974
Kodiyettru Thirunal, the festival celebrated in Swamithoppepathi for eleven days by the followers of the Ayyavazhi
Swathi Thirunal (film) Special Jury Award - Lenin Rajendran Best Play Back Singer - M. Balamuralikrishna Best Art Director
Uzhavar thirunal or Thai Pongal, thanksgiving festival at the end harvest season
Thirunallar
Thirunallur